Walter Lemos Candido (23 March 1930 – 10 June 2014) was an Argentine long-distance runner. He competed in the marathon at the 1960 Summer Olympics.

References

1930 births
2014 deaths
Athletes (track and field) at the 1959 Pan American Games
Athletes (track and field) at the 1960 Summer Olympics
Argentine male long-distance runners
Argentine male marathon runners
Olympic athletes of Argentina
Sportspeople from Santa Fe Province
Pan American Games competitors for Argentina